The flavanones, a type of flavonoids, are various aromatic, colorless ketones derived from flavone that often occur in plants as glycosides.

List of flavanones
 Blumeatin
 Butin
 Eriodictyol
 Hesperetin
 Hesperidin
 Homoeriodictyol
 Isosakuranetin
 Naringenin
 Naringin
 Pinocembrin
 Poncirin
 Sakuranetin
 Sakuranin
 Sterubin
 Pinostrobin

Metabolism
The enzyme chalcone isomerase uses a chalcone-like compound to produce a flavanone.

Flavanone 4-reductase is an enzyme that uses (2S)-flavan-4-ol and NADP+ to produce (2S)-flavanone, NADPH, and H+.

Synthesis 
Numerous methods exist for the enantioselective chemical and biochemical synthesis of flavanones and related compounds.

References

External links